BC Timișoara is a professional basketball club, based in Timișoara, Romania. The club competes in the Liga Națională.

Season by season

Achievements
National League
Runner-up (2): 2008–09, 2011–12
National Cup (2): 2010, 2015
Runner-up (5): 2007, 2008, 2010, 2012, 2013
European competitions:
2011–12: Balkan League: took 4th place (5-5) in Group A
1994–95 FIBA Korać Cup

Current roster

Notable players
- Set a club record or won an individual award as a professional player.
- Played at least one official international match for his senior national team at any time.

References

External links
  
 BC Timișoara At Frbaschet.ro
 BC Timișoara At Totalbaschet.ro
 BC Timișoara At Eurobasket.com
 BC Timișoara At BascheRomania.ro
 BC Timișoara At Facebook.com

Timișoara
Sport in Timișoara
Basketball teams in Romania
Basketball teams established in 1956
1956 establishments in Romania